The 1969 Atlanta Falcons season was the franchise's fourth year in the National Football League (NFL). The team improved on their previous season's output of 2–12, winning six games. The Falcons had yet to reach the post season, and would not until 1978. The Falcons rookie squad would play a preseason game vs the minor league Alabama Hawks.

Offseason

NFL Draft

Personnel

Staff

Roster

Schedule

Note: Division opponents in bold text

Standings

References

External links
 1969 Atlanta Falcons at Pro-Football-Reference.com

Atlanta Falcons seasons
Atlanta Falcons
Atlanta Falcons